Hugo Albert Emil Hermann Dingler (July 7, 1881, Munich – June 29, 1954, Munich) was a German scientist and philosopher.

Life
Hugo Dingler studied mathematics, philosophy, and physics with Felix Klein, Hermann Minkowski, David Hilbert, Edmund Husserl, Woldemar Voigt, and Wilhem Roentgen at the universities of Göttingen and Munich. He graduated from the University of Munich with a thesis under Aurel Voss. Dingler earned his Ph.D. in mathematics, physics and astronomy in 1906. His doctoral advisor was Ferdinand von Lindemann. In 1910 Dingler's first attempt to earn a Habilitation failed. His second try in 1912 was successful. Dingler then taught as a Privatdozent and hold lectures on mathematics, philosophy and the history of science. He became a professor at the University of Munich in 1920. Dingler got a position as Professor ordinarius in Darmstadt in 1932.

In 1934, one year after the Nazis took power Dingler was dismissed from his teaching position for still unclear reasons. Dingler himself told several interviewers that this was because of his favorable writings concerning Jews. In fact both philo-semitic as well as anti-semitic statements by Dingler had been noted.

From 1934 to 1936 he again held a teaching position.

In 1940 Dingler joined the Nazi Party and was again given a teaching position. Of Dingler's 1944 book Aufbau der exakten Fundamentalwissenschaft only thirty copies survived wartime bombing.

Thought
Dingler's position is usually characterized as "conventionalist" by Karl Popper and others. Sometimes he is called a "radical conventionalist" (also referred to as "critical voluntarism" in the secondary literature), as by the early Rudolf Carnap. Dingler himself initially characterized it as "critical conventionalism", to contrast it with the "naïve conventionalism" of other philosophers such as Poincaré, but he himself later ceased to call his position conventionalist. Dingler agrees with the conventionalists that the fundamental assumptions of geometry and physics are not extracted empirically and cannot be given a transcendental deduction. However, Dingler disagrees with conventionalists such as Henri Poincaré in that he does not believe there is freedom to choose alternative assumptions. Dingler believes that one can give a foundation to mathematics and physics by means of operations as building stones. Dingler claims that this operational analysis leads one to Euclidean geometry and Newtonian mechanics, which are the only possible results.

Dingler opposed Albert Einstein's relativity theory and was therefore opposed and snubbed by most of the leaders of the German physics and mathematics community. This opposition, at least to the theory of general relativity, remains in the work of his follower Paul Lorenzen.

Influence
Paul Lorenzen, noted for his work on constructive foundations of mathematics was a follower of Dingler, at least with respect to the foundations of geometry and physics. The so-called Erlangen School of followers and allies of Lorenzen, including Kuno Lorenz, Wilhelm Kamlah, and Peter Janich, and more indirectly, Jürgen Mittelstraß, is thus in large part pursuing a modernized version of Dingler's program which claims to incorporate relativity, quantum theory and quantum logic.

Works
Beiträge zur Kenntnis der infinitesimalen Deformation einer Fläche (thesis directed by Aurel Voss), Amorbach, 1907.
Grundlinien einer Kritik und exakten Theorie der Wissenschaften, 1907.
Grenzen und Ziele der Wissenschaft, 1910.
Die Grundlagen der angewandten Geometrie, Leipzig, 1911 / Die Grundlagen der Geometrie, Stuttgart, 1933.
Die Grundlagen der Naturphilosophie, 1913
Kritische Bemerkungen zu den Grundlagen der Relativitätstheorie, Physikalische Zeitschrift, vol 21 (1920), 668-675. Reissued as pamphlet in Leipzig, 1921.
Metaphysik als Wissenschaft und der Primat der Philosophie, Munich, 1926.
Philosophie der Logik und Arithmetik, Munich, 1931.
Geschichte der Naturphilosophie, Berlin, 1932.
Das System, Munich, 1933.
Das Handeln im Sinne des höchsten Zieles, Munich, 1935.
Die Methode der Physik, Munich, 1938.
Vom Tierseele zur Menschenseele, Leipzig, 1941.
Lehrbuch der Exakten Naturwissenschaften, Berlin, 1944. Edited posthumously by Paul Lorenzen as Aufbau der Fundamentalwissenschaften, Munich, 1964.
Grundriss der methodischen Philosophie, Fuessen, 1949
Ergreifung des Wirklichen, Munich 1955. Reprinted (with intro. by Kuno Lorenz and Jürgen Mittelstrass), Frankfurt, 1969.

References

Further reading
Ceccato, Silvia, Silvio, "Contra-Dingler, pro Dingler" Methodos, Vol. 4 (1952) English transl. 266-290, and Dinger, reply, 297-299.
Toretti, Roberto,"Hugo Dingler's Philosophy of Geometry," Dialogos, vol. 32, (1978), 85-118.
Wolters, Gereon, "The First Man Who Almost Wholly Understands Me: Carnap, Dingler, and Conventionalism," in Nicholas Rescher, ed., *The Heritage of Logical Positivism,Lantham MD: University Press of America, 1985, 93-107.
Carl Friedrich von Weizsaecker, "Geometrie und Physik," in C. P. Enz and Jagdish Mehra, eds., *Physical Reality and Mathematical Description, Dordrecht: D. Reidel, 1974, esp. 60-63.
Jürgen Mittelstraß: Dingler, Hugo in: ders.: Enzyklopädie Philosophie und Wissenschaftstheorie. Zweite Auflage. Band 2, Metzler 2005  S. 218-220
Peter Janich (Hrsg.): Wissenschaft und Leben – Philosophische Begründungsprobleme in  Auseinandersetzung mit Hugo Dingler. Bielefeld 2006, .
Wilhelm Krampf: Die Philosophie Hugo Dinglers. München 1955.
Wilhelm Krampf: Hugo Dingler – Gedenkbuch zum 75. Geburtstag. München 1956.
Peter Schroeder-Heister / Gereon Wolters: Der wissenschaftliche Nachlaß von Hugo Dingler (1881-1954). Verzeichnis mit einer Bibliographie der Schriften Dinglers. Konstanz 1979.
Bruno Thüring: Dr. Hugo Dingler, Universitätsprofessor, München. In: Aschaffenburger Jahrbuch für Geschichte, Landeskunde und Kunst des Untermaingebietes. 3, 1956, S. 408–411.
Jörg Willer: Relativität und Eindeutigkeit – Hugo Dinglers Beitrag zur Begründungsproblematik. Meisenheim 1973.
Gereon Wolters: Opportunismus als Naturanlage: Hugo Dingler und das ‚Dritte Reich''', in: Peter Janich (Hrsg.), Entwicklungen der methodischen Philosophie, Frankfurt a. M. 1992, S. 257-327.
Kirstin Zeyer: Die methodische Philosophie Hugo Dinglers und der transzendentale Idealismus Immanuel Kants.'' Hildesheim 1999. .

External links
 

1881 births
1954 deaths
20th-century German philosophers
Philosophy academics
Philosophers of science
German science writers
Scientists from Munich
People from the Kingdom of Bavaria
Ludwig Maximilian University of Munich alumni
German male non-fiction writers
Relativity critics